Parakənd (also, Parakend) is a village and municipality in the Gadabay Rayon of Azerbaijan.  It has a population of 1,979.  The municipality consists of the villages of Parakənd and Qaravultomba.

References 

Populated places in Gadabay District